Zhagaram is a 2019 Indian Tamil-language adventure thriller film directed by debutant director Krish. Starring Nandha Durairaj in the lead role, the film is an adaption of Kava Kamz's Tamil fiction novel, Project AK. The film has been titled after Zha, one of the most popular and peculiar letters in the Tamil language. Featuring music composed by Dharan Kumar, the film also stars Eden Kuriakose as the female lead, and has been produced with a budget of ₹1 million.

The film follows Akhil, a young man who decides to uncover the mystery behind a treasure after he discovers clues left by his grandfather, an archaeologist who was himself on the trail of this treasure. Accompanied by his friends, Akhil embarks on a treasure hunt that leads them to places like Mahabalipuram, Thanjavur and Coimbatore, while another group after the same treasure attempts to prevent them from discovering it.

The film was released theatrically on 12 April 2019.

Plot 
The film is about a few youngsters of the 21st century who go in search of hidden treasures. What starts off as a city-centric subject, leads to various other places like Mahabalipuram, Thanjavur and Coimbatore.

Cast 

Nandha Durairaj as Akhil
Eden Kuriakose as Sneha
Vishnu Bharath as Surya
Rajashekhar as Sivagnyanam
Meenesh Krishnaa
Chandra Mohan
Subash Kannan
Kothandam

Music 
Dharan Kumar scored the film's soundtrack. The soundtrack received positive reviews from critics.

References

External links 
 

2010s Tamil-language films
2010s adventure thriller films
Indian adventure thriller films
2019 films
Films shot in Tamil Nadu
Films scored by Dharan Kumar